Manor Township is the name of some places in the U.S. state of Pennsylvania:

Manor Township, Armstrong County, Pennsylvania
Manor Township, Lancaster County, Pennsylvania

Pennsylvania township disambiguation pages